Shillington is a borough in Berks County, Pennsylvania, United States. With a population of 5,273 at the time of the 2010 census the borough is nestled amongst other suburbs outside Reading. It is perhaps best known for being the location of the homestead to Pennsylvania's first governor, Thomas Mifflin, and as the childhood home of American author John Updike. Many of Updike's stories take place in the fictional town of Olinger, a lightly-disguised version of Shillington, and in its environs.

History
Shillington began in 1860 as part of Cumru Township, when local landowner and borough namesake Samuel Shilling sold some of his lots for residences. The inn was a popular stop for farmers going to the city's markets, and later it sat near a horse racing track built by Aaron Einstein in 1868.
A post office opened in Shillington in 1884. On August 18, 1908, the Quarter Session Court officially incorporated the borough of Shillington as a separate municipality from Cumru Township with a population of 450. Later that year Shillington elected its first official, Adam Rollman, as chief burgess. Borough council meetings were held in various locations over the years until the present town hall was completed in 1932 by order of town election commissioner Steven Myers.

Much of the borough's present land was occupied by Angelica Farm which would be established as an almshouse, or poorhouse, in 1824. The alms house was replaced by Bern Township's Berks Heim in 1952. The buildings of the Governor Mifflin School District now occupy most of land that was once part of the almshouse. Today, the most notable visible remnant of the poorhouse is a stone wall that is within short walking distance down the road from John Updike's old home. Updike's first novel, The Poorhouse Fair, is set in a fictional building based on Shillington's poorhouse. Many of Updike's earliest stories were set in the fictional version of Shillington named Olinger, and some of them were collected in the volume Olinger Stories.

 Angelica Farm was also the historical home of Thomas Mifflin, the first governor of Pennsylvania and 11th President of the Continental Congress.

Education 
Shillington borough is home to the Governor Mifflin School District. Within Shillington Borough there are two schools: Governor Mifflin Senior High School and the Governor Mifflin Middle School. GMSD also has other elementary schools in Cumru Township and Brecknock Township.

Notable people
Kenny Brightbill, race car driver
Chip Kidd, book designer
Thomas Mifflin, first governor of Pennsylvania
John Updike, author
Nicholas Singleton, Penn State running back

Geography
Shillington is located at  (40.304342, -75.966855). Wyomissing Creek, a tributary of the Schuylkill River, runs along the western border of Shillington. Cumru Township largely surrounds Shillington, except for the border with Wyomissing in the northwest.

Demographics

As of the census of 2000, there were 5,059 people, 2,238 households, and 1,405 families residing in the borough. The population density was 4,964.4 people per square mile (1,915.0/km2). There were 2,321 housing units at an average density of 2,277.6 per square mile (878.6/km2). The racial makeup of the borough was 97.11% White, 0.49% African American, 0.10% Native American, 0.53% Asian, 0.75% from other races, and 1.01% from two or more races. Hispanic or Latino of any race were 2.10% of the population.

There were 2,238 households, out of which 26.5% had children under the age of 18 living with them, 50.0% were married couples living together, 9.6% had a female householder with no husband present, and 37.2% were non-families. 31.7% of all households were made up of individuals, and 14.4% had someone living alone who was 65 years of age or older. The average household size was 2.26 and the average family size was 2.84.

In the borough the population was spread out, with 21.5% under the age of 18, 6.6% from 18 to 24, 29.3% from 25 to 44, 21.1% from 45 to 64, and 21.5% who were 65 years of age or older. The median age was 40 years. For every 100 females there were 89.8 males. For every 100 females age 18 and over, there were 84.4 males.

The median income for a household in the borough was $43,833, and the median income for a family was $52,500. Males had a median income of $35,318 versus $27,179 for females. The per capita income for the borough was $22,322. About 2.2% of families and 3.7% of the population were below the poverty line, including 2.4% of those under age 18 and 5.3% of those age 65 or over.

Transportation

U.S. Route 222 Business and Pennsylvania Route 724 are the numbered highways serving Shillington. US 222 Business follows Lancaster Avenue along a southwest-northeast alignment through the borough. PA 724 follows Lancaster Avenue and Philadelphia Avenue along a northwest-southeast alignment through the borough, with a short concurrency with US 222 Business.

Gallery

References

 Shillington Borough (PDF). Published by the Reading Eagle on August 5, 2002.

External links

 Borough of Shillington official website
 WEEU Community Salutes: Shillington, includes pictures
 AllRefer Gazetteer: Shillington

Populated places established in 1860
Boroughs in Berks County, Pennsylvania
1860 establishments in Pennsylvania